Discovery Airways was an airline that provided inter-island service within the state of Hawaii in March 1990. It closed three months later in July 1990 after it was accused of violating a law that states that airlines in the United States must be controlled by American citizens.

History 
Formed in 1989 by former Continental Airlines manager and Mid Pacific Air Director of Marketing Franco Mancassola, the airline operated flights from Honolulu to Kahului, Lihue, and Kona.

After plans for the airline were announced, competing carriers Aloha Airlines and Hawaiian Airlines and their unions filed objections with the United States Department of Transportation (DoT), requesting further investigation of the airline's ownership. 75% of the company's stock was owned by Phillip Ho, chairman of the airline and head of Nansay Hawaii, a Japanese real estate development firm. Mancassola, an Italian citizen, controlled 15% of the company. British Aerospace, supplier of the airline's BAe 146 aircraft, contributed $2.5 million, and Nansay provided up to $12 million in loans. The DoT issued a nine-month provisional certificate, giving the airline time to prove it was controlled by American interests. Flights began on March 25, 1990.

Ho refused to appear before the DOT without a subpoena and was ultimately unable to prove American citizenship. Discovery Airways was ordered to cease operations within one week on July 6, and the airline shut down on July 13. An attempt to sell Ho's interest was ruled insufficient since much of the airline's start-up financing was Japanese, and the airline was sold later in the year to K P Harvest. In August 1991, the airline filed for Chapter 7 bankruptcy after K P Harvest itself went bankrupt.

Mancassola went on to start Debonair in the United Kingdom in 1996, which also operated the BAe 146 and featured the same livery and logo on its aircraft as Discovery.

Destinations

United States
Hawaii
Honolulu (Honolulu International Airport)
Kahului (Kahului Airport)
Kona (Kona International Airport)
Lihue (Lihue Airport)

Fleet

Discovery operated a total of five British Aerospace BAe 146-200 aircraft. After shutdown these aircraft were later leased to Business Express Airlines.

See also 
 List of defunct airlines of the United States

References

Bibliography

 

Defunct airlines of the United States
Airlines established in 1989
Airlines disestablished in 1991
Defunct companies based in Hawaii
Transportation in Honolulu
Companies that have filed for Chapter 7 bankruptcy
1989 establishments in Hawaii
1991 disestablishments in Hawaii